Tinagma mongolicum is a moth in the Douglasiidae family. It is found in Transbaikalia, Mongolia and western Siberia.

References

Moths described in 1991
Douglasiidae